Garcia was a German Eurodance project formed in 1996. They released six singles, two of which reached the top 20 in Germany and charted in Austria and Switzerland.

Band History
Antonio Berardi was radio musician at the beginning of his career and owned a home studio. The guitarist, drummer and trumpeter initiated the Garcia project in the mid-1990s, which in 1996 had a surprise in the German, Austrian and Swiss charts with Vámonos. Co-hosts were Frank Müller, who was also a member of C-Block, and Michael Eisele.

It followed with Te quiero, Latina another charter success in Germany. In 1997, Bamboleo joined the  success of Vámonos . Also La vida Bonita and Kalimba de luna placed themselves in 1998 and 1999 in different hitparades. At the end of the 1990s, interest in Garcia's danceable Latin pop fell, and Imagine flopped. There was no further publication.

Discography

Singles

References

External links
The Eurodance Encyclopaedia

German electronic music groups
German Eurodance groups